One More Story (1988) is the third solo album for music artist Peter Cetera and his second album after leaving the group Chicago. The album was co-produced by Patrick Leonard and Peter Cetera, and contains an appearance by Leonard's most famous artist at the time, Madonna (appearing on the song "Scheherazade" as 'Lulu Smith'). It also features Pink Floyd guitarist David Gilmour on "Body Language" and "You Never Listen to Me", as well as Oak Ridge Boys bass vocalist Richard Sterban and guitarist/vocalist Bonnie Raitt on "Save Me."

One More Story peaked at number 58 on the Billboard 200 chart. Singles include the hit, "One Good Woman," which made it to number four on the Billboard Hot 100, and "Best of Times" peaking at number 59.

"Save Me" was used as the opening theme during the first season of the NBC television show, Baywatch.  Incidentally, drummer Tris Imboden appears on this album. He would later join Chicago, replacing original drummer Danny Seraphine. "Heaven Help This Lonely Man" was used on the American daytime serial Santa Barbara.  The song "You Never Listen to Me" plays during the first scene of the Miami Vice Season 5 episode, "Redemption In Blood: Part 2," but is not credited on screen.

Track listing
 "Best of Times" (Peter Cetera, Patrick Leonard) – 4:13
 "One Good Woman" (Cetera, Leonard) – 4:35
 "Peace of Mind" (Cetera, Leonard, Bill LaBounty) – 4:25
 "Heaven Help This Lonely Man" (Cetera, Leonard) – 4:25
 "Save Me" (Cetera, David Foster) – 4:21
 "Holding Out" (LaBounty, David Innes) – 5:12
 "Body Language (There in the Dark)" (Cetera, Leonard) – 4:44
 "You Never Listen to Me" (Cetera, Leonard) – 4:54
 "Scheherazade" (Cetera, Leonard, Diane Nini) – 5:28
 "One More Story" (Cetera, Leonard) – 3:41

Production 
 Producers – Peter Cetera and Patrick Leonard
 Engineer – Rick Holbrook
 Assistant Engineers – Kevin Killen and Michael Vail Blum
 Recorded at Lion Share Recording (Los Angeles, CA); Johnny Yuma Recording (Burbank, CA); Chartmaker Studios (Malibu, CA).
 Mixed by Brian Malouf at Skip Saylor Recording (Los Angeles, CA).
 Mastered by Doug Sax at The Mastering Lab (Hollywood, CA).
 Production Coordinator – Ivy Skoff 
 Art Direction and Design – Jeri Heiden
 Photography – Nicola Dill
 Illustration – Peter Cetera
 Management – Arthur Spivak and DeMann Entertainment

Personnel 
 Peter Cetera – lead vocals, backing vocals (1-9), percussion (9)
 Patrick Leonard – keyboards, synthesizers, acoustic piano (2, 10), Hammond organ (3, 5), drum programming (3, 4, 6, 9), horns (7)
 Dann Huff – guitar (1-4, 6, 9), additional guitar (8)
 James Harrah – guitar (1, 3-5, 7)
 Bruce Gaitsch – acoustic guitar (4), guitar (6)
 Bonnie Raitt – guitar (5), backing vocals (5)
 David Williams – guitar (7)
 David Gilmour – guitar solo (7, 8), lead guitar (8)
 Richard Garneau – sitar (9)
 Jerry Watts, Jr. – electric bass (4, 9)
 Guy Pratt – bass (8)
 Jonathan Moffett – drums (1, 4-8)
 John Robinson – drums (2)
 Paulinho da Costa – percussion (1, 4, 5, 7)
 Jody Cortez – hi-hat (3)
 Ron Wagner – percussion (5, 9), tabla (9)
 Tris Imboden – hi-hat (9)
 Raja – dunbak (9), first chant (9)
 Kenny Cetera – backing vocals (1, 3, 5, 7, 8)
 Siedah Garrett – backing vocals (1, 3, 8, 9)
 Niki Haris – backing vocals (1, 3, 8, 9)
 Richard Sterban – backing vocals (5)
 Shahrokh – second chant (9)
 Madonna – backing vocals as 'Lulu Smith' (9)

References

1988 albums
Peter Cetera albums
Albums produced by Patrick Leonard
Warner Records albums